VR Sports Powerboat Racing is a racing game developed by British studio Promethean Designs Ltd. and published by Interplay Productions division VR Sports in North America in 1998. Game Boy Color and Nintendo 64 ports were planned for release in the 2000s, but were later canceled.

Gameplay
VR Sports Powerboat Racing is a racing game where players choose from 16 craft with different engine sizes and handling. Up to four players are supported via a split screen.

Reception

The PC version received mixed reviews, while the PlayStation version received unfavorable reviews, according to the review aggregation website GameRankings. Next Generation said of the latter version, "If only the game had more control over camera placement, it might have earned an extra star."

References

External links
 

1998 video games
Cancelled Game Boy Color games
Cancelled Nintendo 64 games
Motorboat racing video games
Multiplayer and single-player video games
PlayStation (console) games
Promethean Designs games
Video games developed in the United Kingdom
Windows games